Treviso Airport, sometimes Venice-Treviso Airport, is an international airport located  west-southwest of Treviso and approximately  away from the city of Venice, Italy. It is used mainly by low-cost airlines.

Some airlines refer to the airport unofficially as "Venice-Treviso" or similar. The primary airport serving Venice is Venice Marco Polo Airport.

The airport has created several disputes of the inhabitants of the urban centers of Quinto di Treviso and Treviso given by low -altitude flights, as well as the proximity to the protected area of the Regional Natural Park of the Sile River. Hence the birth of several committees against the airport and questions from civil organizations, including Legaambiente.

Overview
The airport stands 18 meters above sea level. The new terminal was opened in 2007. It was named after Antonio Canova, a famous Italian sculptor.

In December 2020, Ryanair announced it would open a new base at the airport consisting of 18 new routes in addition to several existing ones.

Airlines and destinations

The following airlines operate regular scheduled and charter flights at Treviso Airport:

Statistics

Ground transportation

Road
The airport has four parking areas. Three are long-term car parks with a total of 564 places. In front of the terminal building there are an additional 50 parking spaces for short term parking.

Bus
A public bus service, operated by Mobilità di Marca, connects the airport with the railway station (the Treviso Centrale railway station) in the centre of Treviso. Another bus service, connecting with flights for Wizzair and Ryanair, operated by BARZI BUS SERVICE, reaches Venice in 40 minutes by highway. Further coach connections are available from the airport or from the city center of Treviso. Daily coach service operated by DRD to Ljubljana (Slovenia) via  Venice Marco Polo Airport (Venice) and Friuli Venezia Giulia Airport (Trieste) A public bus vice versa service from Treviso to Padua, route 101, is operated by Mobilità di Marca.

References

External links

 Official website
 
 

Airports in Veneto
Treviso
Buildings and structures in the Province of Treviso
Antonio Canova